Gonystylus forbesii is a tree in the family Thymelaeaceae.

Description
The bark is greyish brown. Its flowers are reddish yellow.

Distribution and habitat
Gonystylus forbesii is native to Sumatra and Borneo. Its habitat is mixed dipterocarp, submontane and kerangas forest to  altitude.

Conservation
Gonystylus forbesii has been assessed as near threatened on the IUCN Red List. The species is threatened by logging for timber and by conversion of land for agriculture, especially palm oil plantations.

References

forbesii
Trees of Sumatra
Trees of Borneo
Plants described in 1897